Veranica Tsapkala (born 7 September 1976) or Veronica Tsepkalo is a Belarusian political activist.

Early life
Tsepkalo's mother is Evgenia Shesterikova, sister is Natalya Leonyuk. Her grandfather Peter Shesterikov, was a writer, who has a street name in Mahilioŭ named in his memory.

In 1998, Tsepkalo graduated from the Faculty of International Relations of the Belarus State University with a degree in International Relations. In 2004–2006 she studied at the Higher School of Management and Business of the Belarusian State Economic University. In 2008, she studied at the National Institute of Small and Medium Enterprises in Hyderabad, India.

Tsepkalo works as a business development manager for Microsoft.

2020 election activism
When Tsepkalo's husband Valery Tsepkalo announced his participation in the 2020 Belarusian presidential election, Tsepkalo accompanied him on his trips. On 14 July 2020, Valery was denied registration as a presidential candidate in Belarus. Soon after that, the headquarters of the opposition candidates united their campaigns - Svetlana Tikhanovskaya, Valery Tsepkalo, Viktor Babariko. Since the unification of these campaigns, Veronica became her husband's representative at the campaign rallies of Tikhanovskaya, while Valery and his children left the country fearing for their safety. In addition, throughout the campaign, Veronica was constantly under pressure from the government: from collecting information in the school where children study. Her sister Natalia Leonyuk was summoned to testify against Valery Tsepkalo.

On 30 July 2020, during a rally in Minsk, Veronica spoke about the personal affairs of her family, and cited the falsification of a criminal case against her mother, who at that time was already in a serious medical condition. Fearing the loss of her freedom as a result of political persecution, she fled the country on the eve of the 2020 Belarusian presidential election, joining her husband in Moscow. She cast her vote at the Belarusian embassy in Moscow.

Following the 9 August election where incumbent President Alexander Lukashenko declared victory amid allegations of fraud, Tsepkalo called on other countries to recognize Tikhanovsakaya as the legitimately elected president of Belarus.

On 19 August 2020, it was reported that Tsepkalo was in Poland with her husband and children.

On 8 September, it was reported that Tsepkalo was in Ukraine.

Awards and recognitions 
In October 2020 Tsepkalo was awarded John S. McCaine Freedom Award, USA.
U.S. Secretary of State Michael R. Pompeo honored “the heroes on freedom’s frontlines” in Hong Kong and Belarus and praised the International Republican Institute (IRI) for having “advanced the cause of democracy on almost every continent,” after accepting IRI’s John S. McCain Freedom Award at a virtual event on October 13, 2020.

In December 2020, Tsepkalo was named among the representatives of the democratic Belarusian opposition honored with the Sakharov Prize by the European Parliament.

September 2021 Tsepkalo received Jeane J. Kirkpatrick Award, USA
The International Republican Institute’s Women’s Democracy Network held its annual Jeane J. Kirkpatrick Award ceremony honoring those who have made outstanding contributions to the advancement of women in politics and civil society: "For her role and leadership in building a free and democratic Belarus."

On November 7 Veronica Tsepkalo was awarded Luther prize "Das unerschrockene Wort" ("The intrepid word") in Germany
"With the prize "The Intrepid Word", the Luther cities honor the determination, courageous appearance and peaceful resistance against injustice and oppression".
“

In November 2021 Veronica Tsepkalo was among the Belarusian opposition leaders, who were awarded Csoklich Democracy Prize Kleine Zeitung in 
Vienna, Austria: “At the risk of their lives these three women are fighting against the regime, its violence and human contempt,” said the jury’s statement. “The three women became the face of change, they were the peaceful answer to violence. Your courage has spurred the citizens of Belarus and made political changes appear possible for the first time in a long time.“
The same month International Association of Political Consultants Democracy Medal Presented to Women of Belarus: Mauroicio de Vengoechea, President of the IAPC said, “Individuals are at the heart of democracy and the political process. Through their actions, these three courageous women have demonstrated how to engage their fellow citizens in a positive, non-violent effort to bring about democratic change in their country.”

In May 2022, Tsepkalo was awarded the Charlemagne Prize, together with Belarusian opposition leaders Sviatlana Tsikhanouskaya and Maria Kalesnikava (the latter in absentia).

References

Living people
People from Mogilev
21st-century Belarusian women politicians
21st-century Belarusian politicians
Exiled politicians
1976 births